Alalcomenae is the name of several towns in Ancient Greece.

 Alalcomenae (Boeotia)
 Alalcomenae (Ithaca)
 Alalcomenae (Macedonia)
 Alalkomenes, Boeotia